Edgar Damián Alguera Mercado (born 11 February 2004) is a professional footballer who plays as a goalkeeper for Philadelphia Union II. Born in the United States, Alguera plays for the El Salvador national team.

Career
Alguera is a youth product of De Anza Force, and the academies of Sporting Kansas City and San Jose Earthquakes. He signed with Philadelphia Union II in 2021.

International career
Born in the United States, Alguera is of Salvadoran descent. He represented the United States U15 in 2019. He debuted with the El Salvador national team in a friendly 2–0 loss to Guatemala on 24 September 2021.

References

External links
 
 

2004 births
Living people
Soccer players from San Jose, California
Salvadoran footballers
El Salvador international footballers
American soccer players
United States men's youth international soccer players
American people of Salvadoran descent
Association football goalkeepers
Philadelphia Union II players
MLS Next Pro players
De Anza Force players